Bradbury Foote (April 5, 1894 – December 14, 1995) was an American screenwriter.

Selected filmography
 The Bride Wore Red (1937)
 Of Human Hearts (1938)
 Edison, the Man (1940)
 Billy the Kid (1941)
 Million Dollar Pursuit (1951)

References

Bibliography
  Len D. Martin. The Republic Pictures Checklist: Features, Serials, Cartoons, Short Subjects and Training Films of Republic Pictures Corporation, 1935-1959. McFarland, 1998.

External links

1894 births
1995 deaths
American centenarians
Men centenarians
20th-century American screenwriters